Anne Lingard Klinck (née Anne Lingard Hibbert) is a Canadian academic and writer. The focus of her work is on the classics and she is an authority on the female voice in lyric poetry.

Early life 
She was born to British-Canadian father Sydney Hibbert as Anne Lingard Hibbert.

Education 
Klink has a bachelor's and a master's degree from the University of Oxford. She also has a master's degree from McGill University and she also has a master's and a PhD from the University of New Brunswick.

Career 

Klink worked at the University of New Brunswick (UNB) for eighteen years before retiring as Professor Emerita. While working at UNB she co-directed the English programs.

She is an authority on the female voice in lyric poetry.

Selected publications 

 Animal Imagery in Wulf and Eadwacer and the Possibilities of Interpretation, Papers on Language and Literature, 23 (1): 3–13
 The Old English Elegies: A Critical Edition and Genre Study, 1992 and 2001, McGill-Queen's University Press 
 The Southern Version of Cursor Mundi , 2000, University of Ottawa Press.
 Anne Kilnck and Anne Marie Rasmusen, Medieval Woman's Song: Cross-Cultural Approaches, 2002, University of Pennsylvania Press
 An Anthology of Ancient and Medieval Woman's Song , 2004 Palgrave Press
 Woman’s Songs in Ancient Greece, 2008, McGill-Queen's University Press 
 The Voices of Medieval English Lyric: An Anthology of Poems, 2019  McGill-Queen's University Press,

References 

Canadian women academics
Alumni of the University of Oxford
McGill University alumni
University of New Brunswick alumni
Academic staff of the University of New Brunswick
20th-century Canadian women writers
21st-century Canadian women writers
Living people
Year of birth missing (living people)